Ashley Hickson-Lovence (born 1991) is an author and Lecturer in Creative Writing.

Life

In 2012, Hickson-Lovence graduated from the University of Sussex with a Bachelor of Arts in English.  After receiving his Postgraduate Certificate in Education from the UCL Institute of Education in 2014, he worked as a secondary school English teacher for five years.

In 2017, he completed his Master of Arts in Creative Writing and Publishing at City, University of London part-time, whilst teaching. He is currently completing his PhD in Creative and Critical Writing at the University of East Anglia. He is a Lecturer in Creative Writing at the Arts University Bournemouth.

In his spare time, he formally observes semi-professional referees for the Football Association.

Works

In 2019, he published his debut novel The 392 set on a London bus travelling from Hoxton to Highbury. The narrative takes place over 36 minutes, exploring the perspectives of the passengers on a journey through gentrified London.  Alice Jones, writing for ‘Hackney Citizen’, praised the realism of the novel, saying: ‘That’s the beauty of this novel; I don’t think I’ve ever read a book that seemed so real. And this sense of realism is underpinned by the novel’s firm situation in East London; the route is signposted throughout, and locals will recognise the landmarks.’

His second novel Your Show, published in 2022, is a novelisation of the professional life of Uriah Rennie, the Premier League’s first and only black referee. The novel is told through a series of second-person scenes, and Anthony Cummins, writing in The Observer, praised its ‘freestyle poetry[…]teamed with kick-by-kick reports in this stirring novel about Uriah Rennie, the Premier League’s first black match official.’ while Joseph Owen described it as 'a percussive, breathless novel' in The Literary Review. Jonathan Lieu, writing for The Guardian's sports blog, noted the continued relevance of the novel to racialised exclusion in football and the ongoing abuse of referees. For Lieu, 'the most affecting of the novel are the stuff we know happened'.

Hickson-Lovence is currently writing his third novel ‘About to Fall Apart’.

Bibliography

Novels

 The 392 (2019, OWN IT!)
 Your Show (2022, Faber & Faber)

Essay
 'Why I Wish I Was a Drill Artist' (2022, Jacaranda Books Art Music Ltd)

References

1991 births
Living people